Phurba Tashi Sherpa Mendewa (1971) is a Nepalese Sherpa mountaineer known for his numerous ascents of major Himalayan peaks. These include twenty-one ascents of Mount Everest, five on Cho Oyu, two on Manaslu, and one each on Shishapangma and Lhotse.

2007 to 2013
In 2007, he reached the summit three times in that single season.  

In 2009 Tashi was featured in the Discovery Channel series Everest: Beyond the Limit. He has reached the summit of Everest 21 times. He lives in Khumjung, Nepal.

In the first season of the Discovery Channel series (2006), he was shown carrying double-amputee Mark Inglis down a portion of the lower descent on his back. In 2007, as a result of urging by expedition leader Russell Brice, Tashi agreed to accompany David Tait on his mission to complete the first double traverse of Everest, climbing the north route to the summit, descending on the south side, resting for three days, and then repeating the trip in reverse. Once at Base Camp on the south side of the mountain, however, Tait decided to bow out of the return traverse. Tait said that his decision was influenced by his belief that Phurba Tashi was a far superior climber and would have allowed him all the glory had they continued. Tait summited Everest for a third time in May 2009, again accompanied by Tashi (his 15th summit).

Phurba Tashi completed his 21st summit of Mount Everest in May 2013 while working for Kishan Rai Mountain Experience, matching the record then held by Apa Sherpa. In 2017, he was still one of the record holders of the number of summits on Everest but that record was broken in 2018 by Kami Rita Sherpa.

2014 and subsequent years
A crew was filming on Everest in 2014, planning to chronicle the work of Phurba Tashi. However, the 2014 Mount Everest ice avalanche caused the producers to change the focus to covering the aftermath of the tragic event. Nonetheless, Phurba Tashi was featured prominently in the documentary released in 2015 as Sherpa.

Phurba Tashi retired from climbing Everest after the 2014 season but, "Everest Yak" as he is known, was the head Sherpa for Himalayan Experience/Himex, an Everest climbing company as of 2015. However, the 2015 season was cancelled due to avalanches in the wake of the April 2015 Nepal earthquake.

Phurba Tashi's life was changed again by the 2015 earthquake that also affected his village of Khumjung. "Everything I worked for was destroyed in a minute", he said after the loss of his eight-bedroom trekking lodge in Khumjung, Nepal and the extensive damage to his house. (Mountaineering is also a dangerous occupation. The April 2014 avalanche on Everest killed 13 Sherpas;
in 2015, 10 Sherpas died at the Everest Base Camp after the earthquake. In total, 118 Sherpas have died on this mountain between 1921 and 2018.)

In 2015, he lost both of his parents. Phurba was interviewed at the “Tashi Friendship Lodge” in Khumjung village by Deutsche Welle Adventure sports blogger Stefan Nestler. In 2016, Tashi stayed at base camp and worked for Russell Brice with his Himex guide firm.

A 2018 report stated that as of April of that year, he was continuing to work at Everest’s Base Camp, helping organize expeditions with Brice's Himex company.

Everest summits

May 24, 1999 
May 27, 2001
May 17, 2002
May 25, 2002
September 8, 2002
May 22, 2003
May 31, 2003
May 23, 2004
June 4, 2005
April 30, 2006
April 30, 2007
May 15, 2007
June 14, 2007
May 5, 2009
May 21, 2009
May 5, 2010
May 22, 2010
May 5, 2011
May 20, 2011
May 10, 2013
May 24, 2013 (21st Everest summiting)

See also
Marco Siffredi
List of Mount Everest summiters by number of times to the summit
List of 20th-century summiters of Mount Everest

References 

Nepalese mountain climbers
Sherpa summiters of Mount Everest
1971 births
Living people
Nepalese Buddhists